A Penny for My Thoughts is a role-playing game by Paul Tevis, published by Evil Hat Productions in 2009.

Description
A Penny for My Thoughts is a storytelling game involving amnesiac characters who ask leading questions of each other to find out their histories.

Publication history
Paul Tevis released his game, A Penny for My Thoughts, in the summer of 2009 through Evil Hat Productions. According to Tevis, the game grew out of his entry into the Game Chef 2007 competition.

Reception
Shannon Appelcline describes A Penny for My Thoughts as "the sort of storytelling game that Hogshead Publishing had been producing in its 'New Style' line a decade before". Wired called the game "very clever".

A Penny for My Thoughts won the 2009 Indie RPG Awards for Most Innovative Game.

References
 

Evil Hat Productions games
Indie role-playing games
Role-playing games introduced in 2009